Microsoft Office 2021 (Third perpetual release of Office 16) is a version of the Microsoft Office suite of applications for the Microsoft Windows and macOS operating systems. It was released on October 5, 2021, along with Windows 11, and replaced Office 2019.

Office 2021 remains same major version 16 as previous versions of Office; it introduces new dynamic arrays, XLOOKUP features for Excel, full dark mode support and performance improvements. Support for retail versions of Office 2021 will end on October 13, 2026; unlike older versions of Office, there is no extended support period.

Development 
The office suites updates includes better support for the OASIS OpenDocument file format. The version update adds features to let function, has better search for XMatch function, dynamic arrays, XLOOKUP. It enhances Ink for Translate in Microsoft Outlook and PowerPoint.

Version history

Retail

Volume licensed

References 

2021 software
2021
Office 2021
Office suites for Windows